John Spencer Merriman Jr. (April 22, 1899 – June 1986) was an American football, basketball, and baseball coach.  He served as the head football at Trinity College in Hartford, Connecticut from 1926 to 1928 and the United States Coast Guard Academy in New London, Connecticut from  1930 to 1945, compiling a  career college football coaching record of 48–79–10.

References

1899 births
1986 deaths
Coast Guard Bears football coaches
Coast Guard Bears men's basketball coaches
Trinity Bantams baseball coaches
Trinity Bantams football coaches